Thomas Edward Durcan (born 25 February 1973) is a retired, two-time British Classic-winning Irish jockey. He was champion jockey in the United Arab Emirates on seven occasions and rode over 1,000 winners in Great Britain in career lasting from 1992 to 2017.

Career

Durcan was born in County Mayo, Ireland, and went to boarding school in Naas. The school held him back from a riding career for sometime, as it prevented him riding out for stables. Naas had its own racecourse, and several others within easy reach, so although it was against rules for boys to visit the course, his headmaster tolerated it. After leaving, Durcan joined trainer Jim Bolger as apprentice at the same time as Tony McCoy

His first Group 1 victory came in the 2003 Haydock Sprint Cup on  Somnus. In the middle of the decade, his biggest victories came in continental Europe. In France, he won the Group 1 Prix Morny on Silca's Sister for Mick Channon, while in Italy he won the 2005 Premio Lydia Tesio on Dubai Surprise and 2006 Premio Roma on Cherry Mix. Both were trained by Saeed bin Suroor.

He won the 2007 Oaks for Henry Cecil on Light Shift, and 2009 proved his best season domestically for Group 1 wins, winning the St Leger on  Mastery and the Sun Chariot Stakes on  Sahpresa. This run of success meant that each year between 2007 and 2009 he won over £1 million in prize money, and 2007 proved his most prolific winning year in Britain, when he won 95.

Although only a Group 3 race, the biggest prize money pot of his career was the Dubai Duty Free he won in March 2000 on Rhythm Band for bin Suroor.

In later years, the number of wins were fewer, with between 40 and 60 wins per year. He finished second in the 2012 Epsom Derby, riding Main Sequence, 5 lengths behind winner Camelot. His 2017 season was curtailed by an ankle injury sustained in a fall at Leicester. The fall took place after the winning line, after finishing fifth in a five furlong novice stakes race on Plundered.

On 18 February 2018, Durcan announced his retirement from race-riding at the age of 44.

Statistics by year

Major wins 
  Great Britain
Haydock Sprint Cup -  Somnus (2003)
Epsom Oaks - Light Shift (2007)
St Leger -  Mastery (2009)
Sun Chariot Stakes -  Sahpresa (2009)
 France
Prix Morny - Silca's Sister (2005)
 Italy
Premio Lydia Tesio - Dubai Surprise (2005)
Premio Roma - Cherry Mix (2006)

References 

Living people
 Irish jockeys
1973 births